The Men's 100 meter Race at the IPC Athletics Asia-Oceania Championship 2016 was held at the Dubai Police Club Stadium in Dubai from 7–12 March.

Results
Legend

AS: Asian Record

WR: World Record

PB: Personal Best

SB: Season Best

Fn-False Start

Q- Qualified for Finals

q- Qualified for Finals as per best performance

DNF- Did Not Finish

DSQ- Disqualified

T11

Heat 1/2 

Date- 09:March:2016

Time- 17:02

Heat 2/2 

Date- 09:March:2016

Time- 17:10

Final 

Date- 10:March:2016

Time- 17:28

T12

Final

T13

Final

T34

Final 

Date- 11:March:2016

Time- 17:00

T35

Final 

Date- 07:March:2016

Time- 16:30

T36

Final 

Date- 09:March:2016
Time- 16:48

T37

Heat 1/2
Date- 07:March:2016
Time- 16:47

Heat- 2/2
Date- 07:March:2016
Time- 16:54

Final
Date- 09:March:2016
Time- 16:54

T38

Final 

Date- 07:March:2016

Time- 16:30

T42

Final 

Date- 11:March:2016

Time- 17:08

T44

Final 
Date- 11:March:2016

Time- 17:14

T47

Heat1/2 

Date- 09:March:2016

Time- 18:36

Heat 2/2 

Date- 09:March:2016

Time- 18:42

Final 

Date- 10:March:2016

Time- 17:16

T53

Final 

Date- 08:March:2016
Time- 16:35

T54

Final 

Date- 08:March:2016
Time- 16:35

References 

IPC Athletics Asia-Oceania Championship 2016